The women's shot put event at the 1980 Summer Olympics in Moscow, Soviet Union had an entry list of 14 competitors. The final was held on Thursday 24 July 1980.

Medalists

Abbreviations
All results shown are in metres

Records

Final

See also
 1978 Women's European Championships Shot Put (Prague)
 1982 Women's European Championships Shot Put (Athens)
 1983 Women's World Championships Shot Put (Helsinki)
 1986 Women's European Championships Shot Put (Stuttgart)
 1987 Women's World Championships Shot Put (Rome)

References

External links
 Results

S
Shot put at the Olympics
1980 in women's athletics
Women's events at the 1980 Summer Olympics